Tracy Austin defeated Hana Mandlíková in the final, 6–0, 3–6, 6–4 to win the girls' singles tennis title at the 1978 Wimbledon Championships.

Seeds

  Tracy Austin (champion)
  Hana Mandlíková (final)
  Peanut Louie (semifinals)
  Anna-Maria Fernandez (quarterfinals)
  Hana Strachoňová (third round)
  Amanda Tobin (quarterfinals)
  Maria Rothschild (third round)
  Claudia Casabianca (quarterfinals)

Draw

Finals

Top half

Section 1

Section 2

Bottom half

Section 3

Section 4

References

External links

Girls' Singles
Wimbledon Championship by year – Girls' singles
Wimb